Camon is a surname. Notable people with the surname include:

Alessandro Camon (born 1963), Italian-American screenwriter and film producer
Ferdinando Camon (born 1935), Italian writer
Núria Camón (born 1978), Spanish field hockey player

See also
Kamon (name)